Kathryn Chandria Manuel Bernardo (born March 26, 1996) is a Filipino actress and singer. 

Dubbed as “Asia's Superstar” by various media outlets, People Asia hailed Bernardo as the Box Office Queen of her generation for being the only Filipino actress with two films earning more than P800 million each. Forbes Asia listed her as one of Asia-Pacific’s most influential celebrities on social media. Metro Society included her on their list of Most Influential on Social Media. EdukCircle listed her as one of the Most Influential Celebrities of the Decade.

Bernardo is best known for her roles in the following hit television series Mara Clara (2010–2011) "Princess and I" (2012-2013)., Pangako Sa 'Yo (2015–2016), and La Luna Sangre (2017–2018). She is also known for roles in the films She's Dating the Gangster (2014), Crazy Beautiful You (2015), Barcelona: A Love Untold (2016), The Hows of Us (2018), and Hello, Love, Goodbye (2019), the latter two of which are two of the highest grossing Filipino films of all time.

Personal life
Kathryn Chandria Manuel Bernardo was born on March 26, 1996, in Cabanatuan, Philippines. Her parents are Luzviminda and Teodore Bernardo. She was raised alongside her three siblings: two sisters named Chrysler and Kaye, and one brother named Kevin. She is the youngest in her family.

Bernardo was raised a member of Iglesia ni Cristo. 

In 2018, Bernardo said that she has been in a long-term relationship with her on-screen partner, actor Daniel Padilla since May 25, 2012.

Education
Bernardo studied at OB Montessori Center Inc. before her acting debut in 2003. She was home schooled, and has attended Enderun Colleges, Taguig, where she studied marketing.

Career

Early career
Bernardo began acting in 2003, appearing as the young Cielo on ABS-CBN's It Might Be You. In 2006, she landed her first main role in the TV series Super Inggo playing Maya, the love interest of the main character. She then continued to play different roles in other ABS-CBN shows such as Krystala and Vietnam Rose before landing a permanent spot on the hit kiddie show Goin' Bulilit.

In 2010, Bernardo received dramatic roles, the first being young Victoria on ABS-CBN's Magkaribal and young Jenny on GMA's Endless Love. Coincidentally, both premiered on June 28, 2010.

Bernardo's breakthrough role was her as Mara David/Mara Del Valle in the remake of 1992 television drama Mara Clara with her co-star and off-screen best friend Julia Montes. Since its premiere, the TV series remained a consistent leader in primetime ratings. Affirming its success, the show was nominated in the 2011 Banff World Media Festival's "Telenovelas & Soap Operas" category and marked Bernardo's future as a distinguished actress.

After the primetime teleserye ended, Bernardo soon began appearing in the Sunday afternoon teen show Growing Up. Re-partnering with Julia Montes, the show starred other up and coming ABS-CBN teen stars such as Kiray Celis, Diego Loyzaga and Daniel Padilla. On the show, Bernardo played the role of 15-year-old Ella who lives with her single mother. The show premiered strongly, ranking at number 2 overall on the afternoon block of primetime television.

Bernardo's film career started in 2004 with the movie Gagamboy. However, it was only in 2011 when she, together with her Mara Clara co-star Julia Montes, received a lead role in the movie Way Back Home. The film opened at first place with an estimated PHP 18 million (US$428,571) in its first week that then surpassed other foreign film showings at the time, such as The Smurfs and Conan the Barbarian according to Box Office Mojo.

In that same year, Bernardo was included in Regal Film's Metro Manila Film Festival entry Shake, Rattle & Roll 13. Bernardo took on the horror genre by snagging one of the lead roles of the film's second story called Parola. Her performance received positive reviews. In a review for ClickTheCity.com, Philbert Dy praised Bernardo's acting: "A fantastic performance from Kathryn Bernardo ties it all together. It might just be one of the best things that has ever come out of Shake Rattle and Roll."

Breakthrough and acting collaboration with Daniel Padilla
Bernardo starred in Princess and I, a romance/drama royalty-themed television series, following the success of Growing Up. With a cast flanked by Daniel Padilla as Gino Dela Rosa, Enrique Gil as Prince Jao and Bernardo as Mikay/Princess Areeyah, the teleserye is touted as one of the grandest, being the first Philippine show to be shot in Bhutan. Aside from Padilla and Gil as Bernardo's leading men on the show, Pilipinas Got Talent Season 3 former contestant Khalil Ramos played Mikay's unrequited lover and best friend Kiko. Other veteran actors like Gretchen Barretto and Albert Martinez joined the star-studded cast.

The show garnered unprecedented ratings and appraisal as the number one primetime show in September 2012, opening more doors for Bernardo's shining career. In August 2013, she and Daniel Padilla announcing another television series: Got to Believe in which Bernardo plays Chichay Tampipi, a teenage girl who reunites with her childhood friend Joaquin Manansala (Padilla) after many years; Chichay falls for the rich boy despite their economic differences and family pasts, encountering difficult obstacles that put their love to the test. Got to Believe was also a primetime television hit, gathering 38.6% percent in ratings during the broadcast of the show's final episode and placing at No. 2 on Kantar Media's nationwide TV ranking list.

Together with Padilla, they both starred in a Filipino romantic-comedy movie entitled 24/7 in Love that was released on November 21, 2012. She then starred alongside comedian Vice Ganda together with Daniel Padilla in the 2012 MMFF entry, Sisterakas; in the 1st quarter of 2013, Bernardo, with co-star Daniel Padilla, released her first solo project film from Star Cinema entitled Must Be... Love that was broadcast on March 13.

In December 2013, Bernardo and Padilla starred in the film (an entry for 2013 Metro Manila Film Festival) Pagpag (produced by Star Cinema and Regal Films) which was broadcast on Christmas Day.

Bernardo and Padilla once again headlined a movie adaptation of Bianca Bernardino's best-selling novel named She's Dating the Gangster as part of Star Cinema's 20th anniversary in July 2014. The movie was produced by Star Cinema, co-produced by Summit Media and directed by Cathy Garcia-Molina. This is the 5th movie in which Bernardo and Padilla are paired on the big screen after the success of their romantic comedy television series Got to Believe (which was also directed by Garcia-Molina). According to Star Cinema Advertising Manager Mico del Rosario the film was a financial success, gathering PHP 15 million (US$340,000) on its first day of showing. On its 4th week (August 3, 2014), the movie reportedly grossed PHP 230 million (US$5,476,190). A year after her recognition from FHM UK, Bernardo was ranked 17 behind former Japanese AV Idol Maria Ozawa for the FHM Philippines 100 Sexiest Woman 2015, which won by Jennylyn Mercado.
On December 1, 2014, Bernardo with Daniel Padilla and Vice Ganda were given their own stars in the country's version of the Hollywood Walk of Fame, the Eastwood Walk of Fame, located at Eastwood City, Quezon City.

Bernardo has been involved in singing ventures such as her guest appearances for Daniel Padilla's concert "DOS" and her participation in the soundtrack albums of her primetime television shows.

Bernardo recorded her first solo "Mula Noon Hanggang Ngayon" as part of the soundtrack for Princess and I in 2012 and was originally sung by Lea Salonga. In 2013, she recorded a cover of David Pomeranz's "Got to Believe in Magic" with Padilla for their primetime television Got 2 Believe.

In 2014, she began to venture into music by recording various original songs and releasing her first studio album titled Kathryn. A duet with Padilla titled was used as the theme song for ABS-CBN's Summer Station. Bernardo also released her first solo original song titled "Ikaw Na Nga Yata", which was used in the local airing of the Korean series Pretty Man. On November 6, she released the lead single to her debut album titled "You Don't Know Me" which was written by Marion Aunor and is about a blooming relationship that fails to take off because of the lack of effort of one of those involved to genuinely get to know the other. The album was released on November 30 under Star Music, consisting of eleven songs in total.

Bernardo cites American pop stars Taylor Swift and Ariana Grande as her musical inspirations; she further said she considers local pop sensation Sarah Geronimo and singer Yeng Constantino her idols.

As of 2018, she is in a more than five-year-relationship with Daniel Padilla.

Bernardo is the first and only Filipina actress who breached the ₱800-Million mark for two movies. One was in 2018 for The Hows of Us and the other one is Hello, Love, Goodbye for 2019.

Bernardo currently holds the highest-grossing Filipino Film of All Time for the movie Hello, Love, Goodbye. It also became the highest-grossing Filipino Film in the Middle East, Australia, and North America. Hello, Love, Goodbye broke the Box Office Records of any Filipino Film.

Bernardo was given the "Phenomenal Box Office Queen" award along with her on-screen and real-life partner Daniel Padilla for their movie The Hows of Us, which also broke multiple records in the Philippine Cinema at the 50th Guillermo Mendoza Box Office Awards and received the prestigious Camera Obscura Award from FDCP.

She won "Best Actress" awards at the 35th PMPC Star Awards for Movies and Entertainment Editors' Choice Awards for Movies, or The EDDY'S 2019 for her outstanding portrayal as George in The Hows of Us".

Bernardo was also given the "Box Office Queen" award for the blockbuster movie Barcelona: A Love Untold at the 48th Guillermo Mendoza Box Office Awards.

In 2020, she won as "Best Actress" in Gawad Pasado, along with Judy Ann Santos-Agoncillo. And won "Film Acting Awardee" in Gawad Tanglaw, "Movie Actress of the Year" in Aral Parangal Awards, "Best Actress" in Village Pipol Awards. Meanwhile, she was also nominated for "Best Actress" in Film Academy of the Philippines, Gawad Urian, and Filipino Academy of Movie Arts and Sciences (FAMAS), and "Movie Actress of the Year" in PMPC Star Awards for Movies making her a grandslam nomination in the four major award-giving bodies in the Philippines.

Discography

Album

Singles

Music videos

Filmography

Film

Television

Online series

Music video appearances

Accolades

References

External links

 

1996 births
Living people
21st-century Filipino actresses
ABS-CBN personalities
Actresses from Nueva Ecija
Filipino film actresses
Filipino television actresses
Filipino Christians
Former members of Iglesia ni Cristo
People from Cabanatuan
Singers from Nueva Ecija
Star Music artists
21st-century Filipino women singers